The Port of Victoria may refer to:

Port of Victoria (Texas)
Port of Victoria (Seychelles)

See also
Port Victoria (disambiguation)